The Winson was a short lived British cyclecar manufactured by J Winn in Rochdale, Lancashire in 1920 only.

The car could be ordered with an engine made by either Precision or Blackburne with a tax rating of 8 hp. Gearing was provided by a variable friction disk and then by single chain to the rear wheels.

See also
 List of car manufacturers of the United Kingdom

References 

Cyclecars
Defunct motor vehicle manufacturers of England
Companies based in Rochdale